John Orozco (born December 30, 1992) is an American artistic gymnast who competed in the 2012 Olympics and is the 2012 U.S national champion. He was selected to the U.S. Olympic gymnastics team for the 2016 Olympic Games, but withdrew on July 15, 2016 due to an ACL injury. After graduating High School at 17, John trained for 7 years at the United States Olympic Training Center in Colorado Springs, Colorado.

In 2020, he switched his affiliation to Puerto Rico for international competitions.

Early years
Orozco was born in the Bronx, New York, and is the son of Puerto Rican parents. His mother drove him to and from practices 30 miles away from his childhood home in the Bronx to his gym, World Cup Gymnastics, in Chappaqua, New York, while he was growing up. At the age of 8 years old John was enrolled into free gymnastics lessons at a gym in Manhattan called Sutton Gymnastics. The gym allowed him to be part of a program for children who were socioeconomically disadvantaged. He trained at World Cup Gymnastics in Chappaqua while finishing his high school education at Felisa Rincon de Gautier Institute in Soundview.

In 2007 he won the Junior Visa U.S. National Championships, and became the youngest male gymnast to qualify for the finals. He got a place on the Junior National Team, representing the USA in the Pan-American Games as an alternate. He won three consecutive Junior Visa U.S. National Championships in a row (2007, 2008, and 2009).

He then went on to compete at the Pacific Rim Championships in 2008 and 2010, helping the team to gold medals both times. At the 2010 Pacific Rim Championships in Melbourne, he also won gold medals in the All-Around and Horizontal Bar and silver medals on Pommel Horse, Still Rings and Parallel Bars.

Senior International career
In 2010, John Orozco competed in the US National Visa Championships as a Senior for the first time at the age of 17. Unfortunately, he wasn't able to finish the competition due to sustaining a torn achilles in his right leg while competing on Vault during preliminaries. After surgery and rehab, he was able to return to training.

2011
After graduating from high school, John decided to defer any college plans in order to concentrate on training for the 2012 Summer Olympics, leaving New York to train at the United States Olympic Training Center (U.S.O.T.C.) in Colorado Springs.

John made the Senior National team in 2011 where he performed well at the U.S. National Visa Championships in St Paul, Minnesota. He ranked 2nd on Parallel Bars, 3rd in All-Around, Pommel Horse and High Bar and 4th on Still Rings.

He was chosen to be part of the U.S.A. team travelling to the 2011 World Artistic Gymnastics Championships in Tokyo, Japan where his consistent performances helped the team to a Bronze medal. He went on to compete in the All-Around final where he finished 5th, and the High Bar final where he made a costly error, finishing in 8th place.

After the world championships, it was announced that John Orozco had decided to turn 'pro', forfeiting future NCAA eligibility.

2012
In the first big meet of American men's gymnastics, Orozco took part in the Winter Cup in Las Vegas. In previous years, he had been unable to perform to the best of his ability due to illness or injury at this competition. He ended up finishing the competition in first place, more than 5 full points ahead of 2nd-place finisher Steven Legendre.

He performed in the All-Around at the AT&T American Cup competition at Madison Square Garden, New York City, in March 2012.

At the Visa Championships in St. Louis, Missouri in June 2012, Orozco edged out 2011 All Around Champion Danell Leyva by a slight margin to win the All Around Gold medal and clinch the national championship.

In July 2012, John Orozco competed in the 2012 London Summer Olympics for the United States. He competed in the Men's artistic team all-around and the Men's artistic individual all-around, placing fifth and eighth respectively. In both events he erred on the pommel horse, even though going into the Olympics it was his strongest event. In conjunction with his participation in the 2012 Summer Olympics, Orozco appeared in First: The Official Film of the London 2012 Olympic Games, appearing as the first athlete profiled, giving his backstory and reviewing his actions in competition. In October, Orozco suffered tears to both the anterior cruciate ligament and meniscus in his left knee while performing on the Kellogg's Tour of Gymnastics Champions. He underwent surgery to repair the ligaments, went through rehabilitation and returned to competition.

2013
After sustaining an injury to his left knee during the Kellogg's Tour of Gymnastics Superstars in late 2012, Orozco was out of competition for much of 2013. His first competition since the Olympics was the 2013 US Nationals, where he competed in a leg brace and finished in fourth place; he was named as an alternate to the World Championships team, but was added to the team officially after Danell Leyva withdrew due to injury.

At the World Championships in Antwerp, Belgium, Orozco performed on pommel horse, parallel bars and high bar in the qualification rounds. He qualified in 7th place on the parallel bars and earned a bronze medal in the event final.

In December, Orozco competed at the FIG World Cup event in Glasgow, Scotland. He placed 4th after a fall on the high bar.

2014
In February, Orozco competed at the 2014 Winter Cup, where he won gold on horizontal bar. In August, he competed at the 2014 P&G U.S. Championships in Pittsburgh. He placed first in the high bar competition and second in all-around. In October, he is scheduled to participate in the World Artistic Gymnastics Championships in Nanjing, China, as a member of the U.S. national team.  Orozco re-tore an Achilles tendon in June 2015 and expected to be recovering until 2016.

Switch to Puerto Rican team
In 2020, he changed his affiliation for international competitions from the United States to Puerto Rico, which is where his parents had lived before moving to the Bronx.

Pop culture
He was featured in the Gym Class Heroes music video for "The Fighter" that featured the vocals of Ryan Tedder. The music video opens with Orozco saying: "I'm John Orozco, I'm an Olympic gymnast, I'm from Bronx, NY... and I'm a fighter". The video shows him competing, suffering an ankle injury and training to get back in shape for a comeback. It also uses footage of Orozco's childhood training and of his parents and trainers encouraging him throughout the way.

Orozco also appeared in three episodes of the TV show Law & Order as a background actor.

References

External links
 
 
 Fun Facts with Team USA Gymnasts John Orozco on Gymnastike.org
 John Orozco of USA after his first world all-around finals on Gymnastike.org
 
 John Orozco - After Prelims - 2011 World Championships on USAGymnasticsorg
 
 

1992 births
Living people
American male artistic gymnasts
Olympic gymnasts of the United States
Gymnasts at the 2012 Summer Olympics
Medalists at the World Artistic Gymnastics Championships
American people of Puerto Rican descent
People from the Bronx
Sportspeople from the Bronx